The Epistle of James is a general epistle and one of the 21 epistles (didactic letters) in the New Testament.

James 1:1 identifies the author as "James, a servant of God and of the Lord Jesus Christ" who is writing to "the twelve tribes scattered abroad". The epistle is traditionally attributed to James the brother of Jesus (James the Just), and the audience is generally considered to be Jewish Christians, who were dispersed outside Israel.

Framing his letter within an overall theme of patient perseverance during trials and temptations, James writes in order to encourage his readers to live consistently with what they have learned in Christ. He condemns various sins, including pride, hypocrisy, favouritism, and slander. He encourages and implores believers to humbly live by godly, rather than worldly wisdom and to pray in all situations. 

For the most part, until the late 20th century, the epistle of James was relegated to benign disregard – though it was shunned by many early theologians and scholars due to its advocacy of Torah observance and good works. Famously, Luther at one time considered the epistle to be among the disputed books, and sidelined it to an appendix, although in his Large Catechism he treated it as the authoritative word of God.

The epistle aims to reach a wide Jewish audience. During the last decades, the epistle of James has attracted increasing scholarly interest due to a surge in the quest for the historical James, his role within the Jesus movement, his beliefs, and his relationships and views. This James revival is also associated with an increasing level of awareness of the Jewish grounding of both the epistle and the early Jesus movement.

Authorship 

The author is identified as “James, a servant of God and of the Lord Jesus Christ” (Jas 1:1). James was an extremely common name in antiquity, and a number of early Christian figures are named James, including: James the son of Zebedee, James the son of Alphaeus, and James the brother of John. Of these, James the brother of Jesus has the most prominent role in the early church, and is often understood as either the author of the epistle, or the implied author.

The earliest recorded references to the Epistle of James highlight the contentious nature of the epistle’s authorship. Origen may be the first person to link the epistle to "James the brother of Lord" (Comm. on Romans 4.8.2), though this is only preserved in Rufinus’s Latin translation of Origen. Eusebius writes that "James, who is said to be the author of the first of the so-called catholic epistles. But it is to be observed that it is disputed" (Historia ecclesiae 2.23.25). Jerome reported that the Epistle of James "is claimed by some to have been published by some one else under his name, and gradually, as time went on, to have gained authority" (De viris illustribus 2).

Traditional authorship 
The link between James the brother of Jesus and the epistle continued to strengthen, and is now considered the traditional view on the authorship of the work. The traditional view can be divided into at least three further positions that relate also to the date of the epistle:

 The historical James wrote the letter prior to the Galatians controversy (Gal 2:11–14), and prior to the Jerusalem council (Acts 15);
 The historical James wrote the letter in response to Paulinism of some sort;
 The historical James wrote his letter after the events recorded in Galatians and Acts, but is not in dialogue with Paul or Paulinism.

Many who affirm traditional authorship think James had a sufficient proficiency in Greek education to write the letter himself. Some argue that James the brother of Jesus made use of an amanuensis, which explains the quality of Greek in the letter. Dan McCartney notes this position has garnered little support. Others have advocated for a two-stage composition theory, in which many of the sayings of epistle originate with James the brother of Jesus. They were collected by James’ disciples and redacted into the current form of the letter.

John Calvin and others suggested that the author was the James, son of Alphaeus, who is referred to as James the Less. The Protestant reformer Martin Luther denied it was the work of an apostle and termed it an "epistle of straw".

The Holy Tradition of the Eastern Orthodox Church teaches that the Book of James was "written not by either of the apostles, but by the 'brother of the Lord' who was the first bishop of the Church in Jerusalem."

Pseudonymous authorship 

A prevalent view within scholarship considers the Epistle of James to be pseudonymous. The real author chose to write under the name James, intending that the audience perceive James the brother of Jesus as the author. Scholars who maintain pseudonymous authorship differ on whether this was a deceitful or pious practice.

The following arguments are often cited in support of pseudepigraphy: 
 The Greek in the Epistle of James is rather accomplished, leading many scholars to believe that it could not have been written by Jesus’ brother. While it has been noted that James’s hometown of Galilee was sufficiently Hellenised by the first century CE to produce figures such the rhetorician Theodorus or the poet Meleager, there is no evidence (outside the Epistle of James) to suggest that James attained a Greek education.
 The Epistle of James appears to borrow from 1 Peter, and if this is the case, James must be dated after 1 Peter (often dated between 70–100 CE).
 If the Epistle envisages a conflict with later Paulinism, this would likewise presuppose a time after the death of James.

Dating
According to Josephus (Jewish Antiquities 20.197–203), James the brother of Jesus was killed in 62 CE, during the high priesthood of Ananus. Those who hold to traditional authorship date the epistle to sometime before 62 CE, in the forties or fifties, making it one of the earliest writings of the New Testament.

Those who maintain that the epistle is pseudonymous generally date the epistle later, from the late first to mid-second century. This is based on a number of considerations, including the epistle's potential dependence on 1 Peter, potential response to Paul's writings or Paul's later followers, late attestation in the historical record, and the 3rd and 4th century disputes concerning the epistle's authorship.

The earliest extant manuscripts of James usually date to the mid-to-late 3rd century.

The historiographic debate currently seems to be leaning to the side of those in favor of early dating, although not through irrefutable evidence but through indications and probabilities.

Genre
The Epistle of James is a letter, and includes the an epistolary prescript that identifies the sender (“James”) and the recipients (“to the twelve tribes in the diaspora”) and provides a greeting (Jas 1:1). The epistle resembles the form of a Diaspora letter, written to encourage Jewish-Christian communities living outside of Israel amid the hardships of diaspora life. James stands in the tradition of the Jewish genre of "Letters to the Diaspora", including the letters of the members of the family of Gamaliel, the one preserved in 2 Maccabees 1:1-9, or some copied by Josephus, all of which are characterised by a double opening and an abrupt ending.

Many consider James to have affinities to Jewish wisdom literature: "like Proverbs and Sirach, it consists largely of moral exhortations and precepts of a traditional and eclectic nature." The epistle also has affinities with many of the sayings of Jesus which are found in the gospels of Luke and Matthew (i.e., those attributed to the hypothetical Q source, in the two-source hypothesis). Some scholars have argued that the author of James is familiar with a version of Q rather than Luke or Matthew. 

Other scholars have noted the epistle's affinities with Greco-Roman philosophical literature. The author's use and transformation of Q materials resembles the Hellenistic practice of aemulatio, in which the author must "rival and vie [aemulatio] with the original in the expression of the same thoughts” (Quintilian, Inst. 10.5.5). Other studies have analysed sections of James in light of Greco-Roman rhetorical conventions.

Structure
Some view the epistle as having no overarching outline: "James may have simply grouped together small 'thematic essays' without having more linear, Greco-Roman structures in mind." That view is generally supported by those who believe that the epistle may not be a true piece of correspondence between specific parties but an example of wisdom literature, formulated as a letter for circulation. The Catholic Encyclopedia says, "the subjects treated of in the Epistle are many and various; moreover, St. James not infrequently, whilst elucidating a certain point, passes abruptly to another, and presently resumes once more his former argument."

Others view the letter as having only broad topical or thematic structure. They generally organize James under three (in the views of Ralph Martin) to seven (in the views of Luke Johnson) general key themes or segments.

A third group believes that James was more purposeful in structuring his letter, linking each paragraph theologically and thematically:

The third view of the structuring of James is a historical approach that is supported by scholars who are not content with leaving the book as "New Testament wisdom literature, like a small book of proverbs" or "like a loose collection of random pearls dropped in no particular order onto a piece of string."

A fourth group uses modern discourse analysis or Greco-Roman rhetorical structures to describe the structure of James.

The United Bible Societies' Greek New Testament divides the letter into the following sections:

Historical context 
The exact historical circumstances that occasioned the epistle are unknown. Those who understand James 2 as a polemic against Paul or Paul’s followers suggest an occasion for the letter aimed at opposing Pauline justification. Others have argued that James' discussion on faith and works does not have Pauline categories in view.

Some scholars have suggested that the epistle was written to both Christian and non-Christian Jews, who continued to worship together before the parting of the ways between Christianity and Judaism. The warning against cursing people (Jas 3:9–10) has been read in light of this historical reconstruction, and Dale Allison has argued that “James reflects an environment in which some Jews, unhappy with Jewish Christians, were beginning to use the Birkat ha-minim or something very much like it” to curse Christians.

Poverty and wealth are key concerns throughout the epistle, and these issues are likely to reflect the epistle's historical context. The author shows concern for vulnerable and marginalised groups, such as "orphans and widows" (Jas 1:27), believers who are "poorly clothed and lacking in daily food" (Jas 2:15), and the oppressed waged-worker (Jas 5:4). He writes strongly against the rich (Jas 1:10; 5:1–6) and those who show partiality towards them (Jas 2:1–7).

Doctrine

Justification 

The epistle contains the following famous passage concerning salvation and justification:

This passage has been contrasted with the teachings of Paul the Apostle on justification. Some scholars even believe that the passage is a response to Paul. One issue in the debate is the meaning of the Greek word  ('render righteous or such as he ought to be'), with some among the participants taking the view that James is responding to a misunderstanding of Paul.

Roman Catholicism and Eastern Orthodoxy have historically argued that the passage disproves the doctrine of justification by faith alone (sola fide). The early (and many modern) Protestants resolve the apparent conflict between James and Paul regarding faith and works in alternate ways from the Catholics and Orthodox:

According to Ben Witherington III, differences exist between the Apostle Paul and James, but both used the law of Moses, the teachings of Jesus and other Jewish and non-Jewish sources, and "Paul was not anti-law any more than James was a legalist". A more recent article suggests that the current confusion regarding the Epistle of James about faith and works resulted from Augustine of Hippo's anti-Donatist polemic in the early fifth century. This approach reconciles the views of Paul and James on faith and works.

Anointing of the sick 
The epistle is also the chief biblical text for the anointing of the sick. James wrote:

G. A. Wells suggested that the passage was evidence of late authorship of the epistle, on the grounds that the healing of the sick being done through an official body of presbyters (elders) indicated a considerable development of ecclesiastical organisation "whereas in Paul's day to heal and work miracles pertained to believers indiscriminately (I Corinthians, XII:9)."

Works, deeds and care for the poor 
James and the M Source material in Matthew are unique in the canon in their stand against the rejection of works and deeds. According to Sanders, traditional Christian theology wrongly divested the term "works" of its ethical grounding, part of the effort to characterize Judaism as legalistic. However, for James and for all Jews, faith is alive only through Torah observance. In other words, belief demonstrates itself through practice and manifestation. For James, claims about belief are empty, unless they are alive in action, works and deeds.

Torah observance 
James is unique in the canon by its explicit and wholehearted support of Torah observance (the Law). According to Bibliowicz, not only is this text a unique view into the milieu of the Jewish founders –  its inclusion in the canon signals that as canonization began (fourth century onward) Torah observance among believers in Jesus was still authoritative. According to modern scholarship James, Q, Matthew, the Didache, and the pseudo-Clementine literature reflect a similar ethos, ethical perspective, and stand on, or assume, Torah observance. James call to Torah observance (James 1:22-27) insures salvation (James 2:12–13, 14–26). Hartin is supportive of the focus on Torah observance and concludes that these texts support faith through action and sees them as reflecting the milieu of the Jewish followers of Jesus. Hub van de Sandt sees Matthew's and James' Torah observance reflected in a similar use of the Jewish Two Ways theme which is detectable in the Didache too (Didache 3:1–6). McKnight thinks that Torah observance is at the heart of James's ethics. A strong message against those advocating the rejection of Torah observance characterizes, and emanates from, this tradition: "Some have attempted while I am still alive, to transform my words by certain various interpretations, in order to teach the dissolution of the law; as though I myself were of such a mind, but did not freely proclaim it, which God forbid! For such a thing were to act in opposition to the law of God which was spoken by Moses, and was borne witness to by our Lord in respect of its eternal continuance; for thus he spoke: 'The heavens and the earth shall pass away, but one jot or one tittle shall in no wise pass away from the law.

James seem to propose a more radical and demanding interpretation of the law than mainstream Judaism. According to Painter, there is nothing in James to suggest any relaxation of the demands of the law. "No doubt James takes for granted his readers' observance of the whole law, while focusing his attention on its moral demands."

Canonicity 

The first explicit references to the Epistle of James are found in the writings of Origen of Alexandria (e.g. Comm. on John., 19.23) in the third century. Scholars have generally rejected the possible second century allusions to James in the Apostolic Fathers and Irenaeus of Lyons Against Heresies. Neither is James mentioned by Tertullian (c. 155–220 CE) or Cyprian (c. 210–258 CE), and its authenticity of the epistle doubted by Theodore of Mopsuestia (c. 350–428 CE). In Historia ecclesiae 2.23.25, Eusebius classes James among the Antilegomena or disputed works, stating  it is to be observed that it is disputed; at least, not many of the ancients have mentioned it, as is the case likewise with the epistle that bears the name of Jude, which is also one of the seven so-called catholic epistles. Nevertheless we know that these also, with the rest, have been read publicly in very many churches. 

Its late recognition in the Church, especially in the West, was a consequence primarily of its sparse attestation by earlier Christian authors and its disputed authorship. Jerome reported that the Epistle of James "is claimed by some to have been published by some one else under his name, and gradually, as time went on, to have gained authority" (De viris illustribus 2). 

The Epistle of James is missing from the Muratorian fragment (poss. 2nd to 4th century), the Cheltenham list (c. 360 CE), but was listed with the twenty-seven New Testament books by Athanasius of Alexandria in his Thirty-Ninth Festal Epistle (367 CE), and subsequently affirmed by the Councils of Laodicea (c. 363 CE), of Rome (382 CE) and of Carthage (397 and 419).

During the Reformation era, Martin Luther took issue with the epistle on theological grounds, finding James' description of faith and works incompatible with his understanding of justification. Luther did not remove James from his German translation of the Bible, but he did move it (along with Hebrews, Jude, and Revelation) to the end of the Bible.

See also 
 Abrogation of Old Covenant laws
 Gospel of James
 Jacob (name)
 Pauline Christianity
 Textual variants in the Epistle of James

Notes

References

Bibliography

External links 

  Various versions
 

 
Antilegomena
James
James, brother of Jesus
James